Başmakçı is a village in the İskilip District of Çorum Province, Turkey. Its population is 134 (2022). 
According to some, the geographic center of all the land area of the earth is located a few miles to the north of the village.

References

Villages in İskilip District